Thirty Something is a 2015-2016 Taiwanese drama television series created and produced by Eastern Television. It stars Xiu Jie Kai, Kimi Hsia, Esther Liu and Samuel Gu. Filming began on October 22, 2015 and wrapped up on February 29, 2016. First original broadcast began on December 12, 2015 on TTV airing every Saturday night at 10:00-11:30 pm.

Synopsis 
When a 30-year-old woman hits a career and personal low, can she rebuild her life? He Mei Liang (Kimi Hsia) should be at the peak of her career and life, but she actually finds herself out of a job. She used to work in medical equipment sales, but she let people walk all over her while she was too afraid to stand up for herself, so she ends up hitting rock bottom. Although she used to look down on insurance salespeople, Mei Liang gets a job in the insurance industry and is determined to succeed. Mei Liang is partnered with the more veteran insurance salesman, You Zi Jie (Xiu Jie Kai), who tries to prevent her from making too many gaffes in her new job. Can Zi Jie help Mei Liang rebuild her life and career?

Cast

Main cast
Xiu Jie Kai as You Zi Jie 
Kimi Hsia as He Mei Liang 
Esther Liu as Fang Wen Hui 
Samuel Gu  as Pan Wei Kai

Supporting cast
Lynn Zhang as You Yu Qing 
Huang Pin Xuan as You Ya Han 
Hsieh Chi-Wen as He Qing Ming
Hsieh Li-Chin as He Bao Li 
Soda Voyu as Wu Zheng Hao
Zhang Wei Ni as Zhang Xiao Jing (Xiao Jing)
Zhang Dong Qing as Zhang Jing Fang 
Ma Hui-Chen as Chen Yu Juan

Guest cast
Jay Shih as Lawyer Lan
Francesca Kao as Ms. Lin

Soundtrack
"My Time 我的時代" by Patrick Brasca 
"Rainbows" by Andrew Yeh 
"I Believe in My Belief 我相信我的相信" by Andrew Yeh 
"The Nearness of Distance 親密的疏離" by Celeste Syn 
"Throw You In The River 把你丟進淡水河裡" by Celeste Syn 
"Answer 謎底" by Celeste Syn 
"Brand New Day" by Cindy Yen
"Arrangement 安排" by Cindy Yen 
"Singing a Song Because of Longing For 唱首歌因為思念" by Cindy Yen

Broadcast

External links
Thirty Something TTV Website 
Thirty Something EBC Website  
 

2015 Taiwanese television series debuts
2016 Taiwanese television series endings
Eastern Television original programming
Taiwan Television original programming